Loudness compensation, or simply loudness, is a setting found on some hi-fi equipment that increases the level of the high and low frequencies. This is intended to be used while listening at low-volume levels, to compensate for the fact that as the loudness of audio decreases, the ear's lower sensitivity to extreme high and low frequencies may cause these signals to fall below the threshold of hearing. As a result audio material may become thin sounding at low volumes, losing bass and treble. The loudness compensation feature applies equalization and is intended to rectify this situation.

Calibration
Correct loudness compensation requires a calibrated system with known listening level. Audio level at a listener's ears depends on the listening environment, listener position, speaker sensitivity as well as amplifier gain. For loudness compensation to work correctly the playback system must also accurately assume what volume level was used in mastering. For movie soundtracks this reference volume level is an industry standard and can be used by manufacturers to provide a loudness feature that works with a reasonable degree of accuracy. A home theater product that provides a reference level indication on the volume control can be expected to work well with movie soundtracks.

References 

Tone, EQ and filter